Tobie Smith  (born October 23, 1973) is an American former competition swimmer who specialized in long-distance and open-water freestyle events.  She represented the United States at the 1998 World Aquatics Championships in Perth, Western Australia, winning the gold medal in the 25-kilometer open water event.

To celebrate her completion of her master's degree in kinesiology, Smith swam the English Channel on August 5, 1999.  After swimming two thirds of the distance in an estimated record time, she encountered a force five gale of 19 to 24 miles per hour and white-capped waves.  She finished her channel-crossing in eight hours, 15 minutes; the then current record time was seven hours, 40 minutes.

References

1973 births
Living people
American female freestyle swimmers
English Channel swimmers
Female long-distance swimmers
People from Chappaqua, New York
Sportspeople from Westchester County, New York
Texas Longhorns women's swimmers
World Aquatics Championships medalists in open water swimming
Universiade medalists in swimming
Universiade gold medalists for the United States
Medalists at the 1995 Summer Universiade
20th-century American women
21st-century American women